The Spirit of Law (French: De l'esprit des lois, originally spelled De l'esprit des loix), also known in English as The Spirit of the Laws, is a treatise on political theory, as well as a pioneering work in comparative law, published in 1748. Originally published anonymously, as was the norm, its influence outside France was aided by its rapid translation into other languages. In 1750 Thomas Nugent published the first English translation.  In 1751 the Roman Catholic Church added De l'esprit des lois to its Index Librorum Prohibitorum ("List of Prohibited Books"). 

Montesquieu's treatise, already widely disseminated, had an enormous influence on the work of many others, most notably: Catherine the Great, who produced Nakaz (Instruction); the Founding Fathers of the United States Constitution; and Alexis de Tocqueville, who applied Montesquieu's methods to a study of American society, in Democracy in America. Macaulay referenced Montesquieu's continuing importance when he wrote in his 1827 essay entitled "Machiavelli" that "Montesquieu enjoys, perhaps, a wider celebrity than any political writer of modern Europe" .

Montesquieu said he spent twenty years researching and writing De l'esprit des lois, covering a huge range of topics including law, social life and the study of anthropology. In this treatise Montesquieu argues that political institutions need, for their success, to reflect the social and geographical aspects of the particular community.  He pleads for a constitutional system of government with separation of powers, the preservation of legality and civil liberties, and the end of slavery.

Structure

 Preface
Part I
 Book I: On law in general areas
 Book II: On laws which derive directly from the nature of the government
 Book III: On the principles of the three governments
 Book IV: That laws on education must relate to the principles of the government
 Book V: That the laws made by the legislator must be relative to the principle of the government
 Book VI: Consequences of the principles of the various governments with respect to the simplicity of the civil and criminal laws, the form of judgments, and the establishment of punishments
 Book VII: Consequences of the different principles of the three governments with respect to sumptuary laws, to luxury, and to the condition of women
 Book VIII: On the corruption of the principles of the three governments
Part II
 Book IX: On the laws in their relations to the defensive force
 Book X: On the laws in their relation to offensive strength
 Book XI: On the laws that constitute political freedom in their relation to the constitution
 Book XII: On laws that constitute political liberty in its relation to the citizen
 Book XIII: On the relations which the levying of tributes and the magnitude of public revenues have with liberty
Part III
 Book XIV: On the laws in their relation to the nature of the climate
 Book XV: How the laws of civil slavery relate to the nature of the climate
 Book XVI: How the laws of domestic slavery relate to the nature of the climate
 Book XVII: How the laws of political servitude are related to the nature of the climate
 Book XVIII: On laws in their relationship to the nature of the terrain
 Book XIX: On the laws in the relation they have to the principles that constitute the general spirit, the ways, and the manners of a nation
Part IV
 Book XX: On laws in their relationship with commerce, considered in its nature and its distinctions
 Book XXI: On laws in the relation they have to commerce, considered in the transformations it has seen in the world
 Book XXII: On the laws in their relation to the use of money
 Book XXIII: Of laws in their relation to the number of inhabitants
Part V
 Book XXIV: On laws in their relation with religion, considered in its doctrines and in itself
 Book XXV: On laws in their relation with the establishment of religion and its external policy
 Book XXVI: On laws in the relation they must have with the order of things on which they bear
Part VI
 Book XXVII: On the origin and transformations of the Roman laws on successions
 Book XXVIII: On the origin and transformations of the civil laws among the French
 Book XXIX: On the manner of composing laws
 Book XXX: Theory of feudal laws among the Franks, in the relation they have to the establishment of the monarchy
 Book XXXI: Theory of feudal laws among the Franks, in their relation to the transformations in their monarchy

Constitutional theory
In his classification of political systems, Montesquieu defines three main kinds: republican, monarchical, and despotic. As he defines them, Republican political systems vary depending on how broadly they extend citizenship rights—those that extend citizenship relatively broadly are termed democratic republics, while those that restrict citizenship more narrowly are termed aristocratic republics. The distinction between monarchy and despotism hinges on whether or not a fixed set of laws exists that can restrain the authority of the ruler: if so, the regime counts as a monarchy; if not, it counts as despotism.

Principles that motivate citizen behavior according to Montesquieu 
Driving each classification of political system, according to Montesquieu, must be what he calls a "principle". This principle acts as a spring or motor to motivate behavior on the part of the citizens in ways that will tend to support that regime and make it function smoothly.
 For democratic republics (and to a somewhat lesser extent for aristocratic republics), this spring is the love of virtue—the willingness to put the interests of the community ahead of private interests.
 For monarchies, the spring is the love of honor—the desire to attain greater rank and privilege.
 Finally, for despotisms, the spring is the fear of the ruler—the fear of consequences to authority. 
A political system cannot last long if its appropriate principle is lacking. Montesquieu claims, for example, that the English failed to establish a republic after the Civil War (1642–1651) because the society lacked the requisite love of virtue.

Liberty and the separation of powers
A second major theme in The Spirit of Law concerns political liberty and the best means of preserving it. "Political liberty" is Montesquieu's concept of what we might call today personal security, especially in so far as this is provided for through a system of dependable and moderate laws. He distinguishes this view of liberty from two other views of political liberty. The first is the view that liberty consists in collective self-government—i.e. that liberty and democracy are the same. The second is the view that liberty consists in being able to do whatever one wants without constraint. Not only are these latter two not genuine political liberty, he maintains, but they can both be hostile to it.

Political liberty is not possible in a despotic political system, but it is possible, though not guaranteed, in republics and monarchies. Generally speaking, establishing political liberty on a sound footing requires two things:
The separation of the powers of government.
Building on and revising a discussion in John Locke's Second Treatise of Government, Montesquieu argues that the executive, legislative, and judicial functions of government should be assigned to different bodies, so that attempts by one branch of government to infringe on political liberty might be restrained by the other branches. (Habeas corpus is an example of a check that the judicial branch has on the executive branch of government.) In a lengthy discussion of the English political system, he tries to show how this might be achieved and liberty secured, even in a monarchy. He also notes that liberty cannot be secure where there is no separation of powers, even in a republic.
The appropriate framing of civil and criminal laws so as to ensure personal security.
Montesquieu intends what modern legal scholars might call the rights to "robust procedural due process", including the right to a fair trial, the presumption of innocence and the proportionality in the severity of punishment. Pursuant to this requirement to frame civil and criminal laws appropriately to ensure political liberty (i.e., personal security), Montesquieu also argues against slavery and for the freedom of thought, speech and assembly.

This book mainly concerns explicit laws, but also pays considerable attention to cultural norms that may support the same goals. "Montesquieu believed the hard architecture of political institutions might be enough to constrain overreaching power — that constitutional design was not unlike an engineering problem," as Levitsky and Ziblatt put it.

Political sociology 
The third major contribution of The Spirit of Law was to the field of political sociology, which Montesquieu is often credited with more or less inventing. The bulk of the treatise, in fact, concerns how geography and climate interact with particular cultures to produce the spirit of a people. This spirit, in turn, inclines that people toward certain sorts of political and social institutions, and away from others. Later writers often caricatured Montesquieu's theory by suggesting that he claimed to explain legal variation simply by the distance of a community from the equator.

While the analysis in The Spirit of Law is much more subtle than these later writers perceive, many of his specific claims lack rigour to modern readers. Nevertheless, his approach to politics from a naturalistic or scientific point of view proved very influential, directly or indirectly inspiring modern fields of political science, sociology, and anthropology.

See also
Comparative law
Democracy
Doux commerce
Letter and spirit of the law
Rule of law
Mutual Liberty

Notes

References
Montesquieu, L'esprit des loix. Texte établi et présenté par Jean Brethe de La Gressaye (Paris: Societe Les Belles Lettres, 1950–1961. Takes account of variants in all editions issued between 1748 and 1757.
Montesquieu: The Spirit of the Laws, trans. Anne M. Cohler, Basia Carolyn Miller, and Harold Samuel Stone.  Cambridge Texts in the History of Political Thought. Cambridge: Cambridge UP, 1989.      (Paperback ed.; 808 pp.)
Bok, Hilary,  "Baron de Montesquieu, Charles-Louis de Secondat", Stanford Encyclopedia of Philosophy.
Volpilhac-Auger, Catherine, Montesquieu, Paris: Gallimard, "Folio Biographies", 2017.

External links

 de Secondat, Charles, Baron de Montesquieu, "The Spirit of Laws" (Free – The Internet Archive, High Resolution)
  de Secondat, Charles, Baron de Montesquieu, "The Spirit of Laws: Volume 1 ", 1793 (Free – Librivox, Audiobook)
 de Secondat, Charles, Baron de Montesquieu,  "The Spirit of Laws"  2 vols.  Originally published anonymously.  1748; Crowder, Wark, and Payne, 1777.  Trans.  Thomas Nugent (1750).  Rev.  J. V. Prichard.  ("Based on a public domain edition published in 1914 by G. Bell & Sons, Ltd., London.  Rendered into HTML and text by Jon Roland of The Constitution Society.")  Accessed May 16, 2007.
A Montesquieu Dictionary, open access: ""
Montesquieu: The Spirit of Law. Trans. Philip Stewart, 2018. Open access: "".

1748 books
Books in political philosophy
Modern philosophical literature
Montesquieu
Books about sovereignty